The Soloist is a 2009 drama film directed by Joe Wright, and starring Jamie Foxx and Robert Downey Jr. The plot is based on the true story of Nathaniel Ayers, a musician who developed schizophrenia and became homeless. The film was released in theaters on April 24, 2009. It received mixed reviews from critics and grossed just $38 million against its $60 million budget.

Plot
In 2005, Steve Lopez is a journalist working for the Los Angeles Times. He is divorced and now works for his ex-wife, Mary, an editor. A biking accident lands Lopez in a hospital.

One day, he hears a violin being played beautifully. Investigating, he encounters Nathaniel Ayers, a homeless man with schizophrenia, who is playing a violin when Lopez introduces himself. During the conversation that follows, Lopez learns that Ayers once attended Juilliard.

Curious as to how a former student of such a prestigious school ended up on the streets, Lopez contacts Juilliard but learns that no record of Ayers graduating from it exists. Though at first figuring a man with schizophrenia who's talented with a cello isn't worth his time, Lopez soon realizes that he has no better story to write about. Luckily, he soon learns that Ayers did attend Juilliard, but dropped out after two years.

Finding Ayers the next day, Lopez says he wants to write about him. Ayers doesn't appear to be paying attention. Getting nowhere, Lopez finds and contacts Ayers' sister, who gives the columnist the information he needs: Ayers was once a child prodigy with the cello, until he began displaying symptoms of schizophrenia at Juilliard. Unable to handle the voices, Ayers dropped out and ended up on the streets due to the delusion that his sister wanted to kill him. Without a cello, he has resorted to playing a two-string violin.

Lopez writes his article. One reader is so touched that she sends a cello for Ayers. Lopez brings it to him and Ayers shows he is just as proficient as with a violin. Unfortunately, his tendency to wander puts both Ayers and the cello in danger, so Lopez talks him into leaving it at a shelter, located in a neighborhood of homeless people. Ayers is later seen playing for the homeless.

A concerned Lopez tries to get a doctor he knows to help. He also tries to talk Ayers into getting an apartment, but Ayers refuses. After seeing a reaction to music played at an opera house, Lopez persuades another friend, Graham, a cellist, to rehabilitate Ayers through music. The lessons go well, though Ayers is shown to be getting a little too attached to Lopez, much to the latter's annoyance. Lopez eventually talks Ayers into moving into an apartment by threatening to abandon him.

Through Lopez's article, Ayers gains so much fame that he is given the chance to perform a recital. Sadly, he loses his temper, attacks Graham, and leaves. This convinces Lopez's doctor friend to get Ayers help. But when Ayers learns what Lopez is up to, he throws Lopez out of his apartment and threatens to kill him.

While speaking with Mary, Lopez realizes that not only has he changed Ayers' life, but Ayers has changed his. Determined to make amends, Lopez brings Ayers' sister to L.A. for a visit. Ayers and Lopez make up. Later, while they all watch an orchestra, Lopez ponders how beneficial their friendship has been. Ayers still hears voices, but at least he no longer lives on the streets. In addition, Ayers has helped improve Lopez's relationship with his own family.

It is revealed at the end that Ayers is still a member of the LAMP Community – a Los Angeles nonprofit organization that seeks to help people living with severe mental illness – and that Lopez is learning how to play the guitar.

Cast

 Jamie Foxx as Nathaniel Ayers
 Robert Downey Jr. as Steve Lopez
 Catherine Keener as Mary Weston
 Tom Hollander as Graham Claydon
 Lisa Gay Hamilton as Jennifer
 Nelsan Ellis as David Carter
 Rachael Harris as Leslie Bloom
 Stephen Root as Curt Reynolds
 Lorraine Toussaint as Flo Ayers
 Justin Martin as Young Nathaniel Ayers
 Octavia Spencer as Troubled Woman
 Jena Malone as Cheery Lab Tech
 Lemon Andersen as Uncle Tommy
 Noel G. as Winston Street Cop
 Artel Great as Leon

Production
The film is based on the true story of Nathaniel Ayers, a musician who developed schizophrenia and became homeless. Directed by Joe Wright, was written by Susannah Grant, based on a series of columns written by Los Angeles Times columnist Steve Lopez, who chronicled the plight of Nathaniel Ayers, Jr., a musician with schizophrenia, and eventually was chronicled in Lopez's book, The Soloist, which was published in the spring of 2008. The film was budgeted at $60 million, twice the budget amount of Wright's previous film, Atonement.  Production began in January 2008 and was filmed mostly in Los Angeles, with some scenes shot in Cleveland.

Reception

Box office
On its opening weekend, the film opened #4 behind Obsessed, 17 Again, and Fighting, grossing $9.7 million in 2,024 theaters, with a $4,800 average per theater. The film went on to gross just half of its $60 million budget, bringing in $31.7 million domestically and $6.6 million in other territories, for a worldwide total of $38.3 million. This was blamed on the film's initial release date being postponed, as well as the film's release coming one week before the 2009 summer movie season.

Critical response
On Rotten Tomatoes, the film holds an approval rating of 57% based on 207 reviews, with an average score of 5.95/10. The site's critics consensus reads, "Though it features strong performances by its lead players, a lack of narrative focus prevents The Soloist from hitting its mark." On Metacritic the film has a weighted average score of 61 out of 100, based on reviews from 33 critics, indicating "generally favorable reviews". Audiences surveyed by CinemaScore gave the film an average grade "B+" on scale of A+ to F.

Reviewers generally praise the performances by Robert Downey Jr. and Jamie Foxx, but comment on the film's lack of narrative focus in attempting to tell a convincing or engaging story due to the somewhat "uneven" direction by director Joe Wright. Many felt that the project was a bit of a "mismatch" for Wright, and felt it was one of his weakest films to date, following the success of his adaptations of Pride & Prejudice and Atonement.

Roger Ebert of the Chicago Sun-Times wrote: "The Soloist has all the elements of an uplifting drama, except for the uplift. The story is compelling, the actors are in place, but I was never sure what the filmmakers wanted me to feel about it."

Soundtrack
The soundtrack to The Soloist was released on April 21, 2009.

See also
 White savior narrative in film

References

External links

 
 
 
 Nathaniel Ayers Performs July 2009 NAMI Convention

2009 films
2009 biographical drama films
American biographical drama films
African-American films
British biographical drama films
English-language French films
French biographical drama films
Fictional portrayals of schizophrenia
Films scored by Dario Marianelli
Films about homelessness
Films about journalists
Films about violins and violinists
Films directed by Joe Wright
Films set in 2005
Films set in Los Angeles
Films shot in Cleveland
Films shot in Los Angeles
DreamWorks Pictures films
Paramount Pictures films
Participant (company) films
Films with screenplays by Susannah Grant
StudioCanal films
Universal Pictures films
Working Title Films films
2009 drama films
Biographical films about musicians
2000s English-language films
2000s American films
2000s British films
2000s French films
Films about disability